Salvia misella, commonly known as tropical sage, is an annual herb growing throughout tropical America, often found in semi-arid regions on disturbed bushy ground, from sea level to . It is similar and perhaps closely related to Salvia occidentalis, with a longer calyx and a  blue flower.

References

External links
IPNI Plant Names Index
USDA Plants Profile

misella
Flora of South America